The Tsarevich (German: Der Zarewitsch) is a 1929 German silent historical film directed by Jacob Fleck and Luise Fleck and starring Iván Petrovich, Marietta Millner and Albert Steinrück. The film's sets were designed by Willi Herrmann.

Like the 1927 operetta Der Zarewitsch by Franz Lehár it is based on a play by Gabriela Zapolska, inspired by the troubled relationship between Peter the Great and his son Tsarevich Alexei.

Cast
In alphabetical order
Lya Christy
Fritz Eckert
John F. Hamilton as Grigory
Paul Heidemann as Pawel
Senia Kulatschkoff
Marietta Millner as Sonja Iwanowna
Paul Otto
Iván Petrovich as Czarewitch
Albert Steinrück as The Czar

See also
The Tsarevich (1933)
The Little Czar (1954), also with Iván Petrovich

References

External links

Films set in Russia
Films set in the 18th century
1920s historical films
German historical films
Films of the Weimar Republic
German silent feature films
Films directed by Jacob Fleck
Films directed by Luise Fleck
German black-and-white films
1920s German films